Elections in the Regional Municipality of York of Ontario, Canada were held on October 24, 2022, in conjunction with municipal elections across the province.

Incumbents are marked with "(X)".

York Regional Council

Regional chair
The chair of the council will be elected by members of the council at the first council meeting.

Aurora
List of candidates:

Mayor
Incumbent mayor Tom Mrakas was challenged by businessperson Phiona Durrant and writer, editor and photographer Anna Lozyk Romeo.

Aurora Town Council

In 2020, Aurora Council passed a by-law establishing a ward system. Previously Aurora councillors were elected at an at-large basis.

Ward 1

Ward 2

Ward 3

Ward 4

Ward 5

Ward 6

East Gwillimbury
East Gwillimbury elected two councillors per ward. Incumbent mayor Virginia Hackson ran against her predecessor James Young and 2018 candidate Franco Colavecchia. Voter turnout was reported as being just 25%. The lists of candidates for East Gwillimbury Council are as follows:

Mayor

Ward 1

Ward 2

Ward 3

Georgina
The results for mayor and for the council of Georgina are as follows:

Mayor

Georgina Town Council

Regional Councillor

Ward 1

Ward 2

Ward 3

Ward 4

Ward 5

King

The results for mayor and for the council of King Township are as follows:

Mayor
Steve Pellegrini was re-elected mayor of the Township of King by acclamation. Ward 2 councillor David Boyd and Ward 6 councillor Avia Eek were also acclaimed:

Ward 1

Ward 2

Ward 3

Ward 4

Ward 5

Ward 6

Markham
The results for mayor and for the council of Markham are as follows:

Mayor

Mayor Frank Scarpitti was challenged by deputy mayor Don Hamilton.

City Council

Regional Councillor
In Markham, Regional Councillors serve on both the City Council as well as York Region Council. Electors can vote for up to four candidates on their ballots, equal to the total number that may be elected. The four winning candidates are those who receive the highest number of votes. The candidate with the highest number of votes received also serves as Deputy Mayor.

Ward 1

Ward 2

Ward 3

Ward 4

Ward 5

Ward 6

Ward 7

Ward 8

Newmarket
The results for mayor and for the council of Newmarket are as follows:

Mayor

Newmarket Town Council

Deputy mayor and regional councillor

Ward 1

Ward 2

Ward 3

Ward 4

Ward 5

Ward 6

Ward 7

Richmond Hill
The results for mayor and for the council of Richmond Hill were as follows:

Mayor
David West, who was elected in a by-election in January 2022, was challenged in a re-match against Regional Councillor Carmine Perrelli, who finished third in the by-election.

Richmond Hill City Council

Regional council
Two to be elected.

Ward 1

Ward 2

Ward 3

Ward 4

Ward 5

Ward 6

Vaughan
The size of Vaughan's council will increase by one with the addition of a regional councillor. The list of candidates for mayor and for the council of Vaughan are as follows:

Mayor

Incumbent mayor Maurizio Bevilacqua is not running for re-election. Former Ontario Liberal Party leader Steven Del Duca is running against long-time city councillor Sandra Yeung Racco.

Withdrawn
Deb Schulte, former MP and Minister of Seniors. Schulte withdrew after her cancer re-diagnosis. (endorsed Del Duca)

Opinion polls

Vaughan City Council

Regional council
Four to be elected.

Ward 1

Ward 2

Ward 3

Ward 4

Ward 5

Whitchurch-Stouffville
The results for mayor and for the council of Whitchurch-Stouffville are as follows:

Mayor

Whitchurch-Stouffville Town Council

The Town re-drew its ward boundaries in 2020 for the 2022 election.

Ward 1

Ward 2

Ward 3

Ward 4

Ward 5

Ward 6

York Region District School Board 

Source: City of Markham

Source: City of Richmond Hill

Source: City of Vaughan

Indigenous Trustee 
The Indigenous trustee is a voting, appointed member of the board.

Student Trustees 
Student trustees are non-voting members appointed by the York Region President's Council (YRPC), a body consisting of all Student Council Presidents in York Region public secondary schools.

References

York
Politics of the Regional Municipality of York